(lit. Nontan and Friends: Round-and-Round Puzzle) is a puzzle videogame released exclusively in Japan on April 18, 1994, for the Game Boy and on November 25, 1994, for the Super Famicom. The game was developed by Game Freak and published by Victor Entertainment. The game is based on the Japanese children's book Nontan.

Gameplay 

The main objective of the game is to make a group of 2 faces. If they match correctly, the faces disappear. The player can flip the faces in order to match up. After the player reaches 5 levels, the character changes. The game has two modes, being represented by letters.

References

Notes 

1994 video games
Game Freak games
Victor Entertainment games
Super Nintendo Entertainment System games
Game Boy games
Video games about cats
Video games developed in Japan
Japan-exclusive video games
Puzzle video games